Arcadie Sarcadi (15 January 1925 – 2002) was a Romanian water polo player. He competed in the men's tournament at the 1952 Summer Olympics.

References

External links
 

1925 births
2002 deaths
Romanian male water polo players
Olympic water polo players of Romania
Water polo players at the 1952 Summer Olympics
People from Aiud